Wayne Kaatz (also credited as Wayne Katz) is an American writer and actor. His credits include episodes of the animated series Problem Child, Tiny Toon Adventures (on which he was also story editor), The Completely Mental Misadventures of Ed Grimley and The Brave Little Toaster.

In 1991, Kaatz, Tom Ruegger, and Bruce Broughton shared the Daytime Emmy Award for Outstanding Original Song for the Tiny Toon Adventures main title theme.

Kaatz was among the jurors in United States v. Elizabeth A. Holmes, et al. that reached a partial guilty verdict in January 2022. Kaatz spoke publicly after it concluded, saying "It's tough to convict somebody, especially somebody so likable, with such a positive dream."

Filmography

Writing

Television

Acting

Film

References

External links
 

Living people
American male film actors
American male television actors
American male television writers
American male voice actors
Daytime Emmy Award winners
Year of birth missing (living people)